The 1948 Brigg by-election was a by-election held on 24 March 1948 for the British House of Commons constituency of Brigg in Lincolnshire.

The by-election was triggered by the resignation of the constituency's Labour Party Member of Parliament (MP) Tom Williamson, a trade union leader who had held the seat since the 1945 general election.

The result was a victory for the Labour candidate Lance Mallalieu, who held the seat with a reduced majority, and represented Brigg until he retired from the House of Commons in 1974.

Votes

References

See also 
 List of United Kingdom by-elections
 Wansbeck constituency

1948 elections in the United Kingdom
1948 in England
March 1948 events in the United Kingdom
20th century in Lincolnshire
1948
By-elections to the Parliament of the United Kingdom in Lincolnshire constituencies